Old Azeri (also spelled Adhari, Azeri or Azari) is the extinct Iranian language that was once spoken in the northwestern Iranian historic region of Azerbaijan (Iranian Azerbaijan) before the Turkification of the region. Some linguists believe the southern Tati varieties of Iranian Azerbaijan around Takestan such as the Harzandi and Karingani dialects to be remnants of Old Azeri. In addition, Old Azeri is known to have strong affinities with Talysh.

Old Azeri was the dominant language in Azerbaijan before it was replaced by Azerbaijani, which is a Turkic language.

Initial studies 
Ahmad Kasravi, a predominant Iranian Azeri scholar and linguist, was the first scholar who examined the Iranian language of Iran's historic Azerbaijan region. He conducted comprehensive research using Arabic, Persian, Turkish and Greek historical sources and concluded that Old Azeri was the language of this region of Iran before adopting the Turkic language of the same name. Historical research showed that Azeris were an Iranic people before the arrival of Seljuq Turks to the region.

Linguistic affiliation
Old Azari was spoken in most of Azerbaijan at least up to the 17th century, with the number of speakers decreasing since the 11th century due to the Turkification of the area. According to some accounts, it may have survived for several centuries after that up to the 16th or 17th century. Today, Iranian dialects are still spoken in several linguistic enclaves within Azarbaijan. While some scholars believe that these dialects form a direct continuation of the ancient Azari languages, others have argued that they are likely to be a later import through migration from other parts of Iran, and that the original Azari dialects became extinct.

According to Vladimir Minorsky, around the 9th or 10th century:

Clifford Edmund Bosworth says: 

Igrar Aliyev states that:

Aliyev states that medieval Muslim historians like al-Baladhuri, al-Masudi, ibn Hawqal and Yaqut al-Hamawi mentioned this language by name. Other such writers are Estakhri, Ibn al-Nadim, Hamza al-Isfahani, al-Muqaddasi, Ya'qubi,  Hamdallah Mustawfi and Muhammad ibn Musa al-Khwarizmi.

According to Gilbert Lazard, "Azarbaijan was the domain of Adhari, an important Iranian dialect which Masudi mentions together with Dari and Pahlavi."

According to Richard N. Frye, Azari was a major Iranian language and the original language of Iranian Azerbaijan. It gradually lost its status as the majority language by the end of the 14th century.

Historical attestations

Ebn al-Moqaffa’ (died 142/759) is quoted by ibn Al-Nadim in his famous Al-Fihrist as stating that Azerbaijan, Nahavand, Rayy, Hamadan and Esfahan speak Fahlavi (Pahlavi) and collectively constitute the region of Fahlah.

A very similar statement is given by the medieval historian Hamzeh Isfahani when talking about Sassanid Iran.  Hamzeh Isfahani writes in the book Al-Tanbih ‘ala Hoduth alTashif that five "tongues" or dialects, were common in Sassanian Iran: Fahlavi, Dari, Persian, Khuzi and Soryani.  Hamzeh (893-961 CE) explains these dialects in the following way:

Ibn Hawqal states:

Ibn Hawqal mentions that some areas of Armenia are controlled by Muslims and others by Christians.

Abu al-Hasan Ali ibn al-Husayn Al-Masudi (896-956), the Arab historian states:

Al-Moqaddasi (died late 10th century) considers Azerbaijan as part of the 8th division of lands.  He states:"The languages of the 8th division is Iranian (al-‘ajamyya). It is partly Dari and partly convoluted (monqaleq) and all of them are named Persian".

Al-Moqaddasi also writes on the general region of Armenia, Arran and Azerbaijan and states:

Ahmad ibn Yaqubi mentions that the People of Azerbaijan are a mixture of Azari 'Ajams ('Ajam is a term that developed to mean Iranian) and old Javedanis (followers of Javidan the son of Shahrak who was the leader of Khurramites and succeeded by Babak Khorramdin).

Zakarrya b. Mohammad Qazvini's report in Athar al-Bilad, composed in 1275, that "no town has escaped being taken over by the Turks except Tabriz" (Beirut ed., 1960, p. 339) one may infer that at least Tabriz had remained aloof from the influence of Turkish until the time.

From the time of the Mongol invasion, most of whose armies were composed of Turkic tribes, the influence of Turkish increased in the region. On the other hand, the old Iranian dialects remained prevalent in major cities. Hamdallah Mostawafi writing in the 1340s calls the language of Maraqa as "modified Pahlavi" (Pahlavi-ye Mughayyar). Mostowafi calls the language of Zanjan (Pahlavi-ye Raast). The language of Gushtaspi covering the Caspian border region between Gilan to Shirvan is called a Pahlavi language close to the language of Gilan.

Following the Islamic Conquest of Iran, Middle Persian, also known as Pahlavi, continued to be used until the 10th century when it was gradually replaced by a new breed of Persian language, most notably Dari. The Saffarid dynasty in particular was the first in a line of many dynasties to officially adopt the new language in 875 CE. Thus Dari, which contains many loanwords from its predecessors, is considered the continuation of Middle Persian which was prevalent in the early Islamic era of western Iran. The name Dari comes from the word (دربار) which refers to the royal court, where many of the poets, protagonists, and patrons of the literature flourished.

The Iranian dialect of Tabriz

According to Jean During, the inhabitants of Tabriz did not speak Turkish in the 15th century.

The language of Tabriz, being an Iranian language, was not the standard Khurasani Dari. Qatran Tabrizi (11th century) has an interesting couplet mentioning this fact:

There are extant words, phrases, sentences and poems attested in the old Iranian dialect of Tabriz in a variety of books and manuscripts.

Hamdullah Mustuwafi (14th century) mentions a sentence in the language of Tabriz:

A Macaronic (mula'ma which is popular in Persian poetry where some verses are in one language and another in another language) poem from Homam Tabrizi, where some verses are in Khorasani (Dari) Persian and others are in the dialect of Tabriz.

Another Ghazal from Homam Tabrizi where all the couplets except the last couplet is in Persian. The last couplet reads:

Another recent discovery by the name of Safina-yi Tabriz has given sentences from native of Tabriz in their peculiar Iranian dialect. The work was compiled during the Ilkhanid era. A sample expression from the mystic Baba Faraj Tabrizi in the Safina:

The Safina (written in the Ilkhanid era) contains many poems and sentences from the old regional dialect of Azerbaijan. Another portion of the Safina contains a direct sentence in what the author has called "Zaban-i-Tabriz" (dialect/language of Tabriz)

A sentence in the dialect of Tabriz (the author calls Zaban-i-Tabriz (dialect/language of Tabriz) recorded and also translated by Ibn Bazzaz Ardabili in the Safvat al-Safa:

A sentence in the dialect of Tabriz by Pir Zehtab Tabrizi addressing the Qara-qoyunlu ruler Eskandar:

The word Rood for son is still used in some Iranian dialects, especially the Larestani dialect and other dialects around Fars.

Four quatrains titled fahlavvviyat from Khwaja Muhammad Kojjani (died 677/1278-79); born in Kojjan or Korjan, a village near Tabriz, recorded by Abd-al-Qader Maraghi. A sample of one of the four quatrains from Khwaja Muhammad Kojjani
.

Two qet'as (poems) quoted by Abd-al-Qader Maraghi in the dialect of Tabriz (died 838/1434-35; II, p. 142). A sample of one these poems

A Ghazal and fourteen quatrains under the title of fahlaviyat by the poet Maghrebi Tabrizi (died 809/1406-7).

A text probably by Mama Esmat Tabrizi, a mystical woman-poet of Tabriz (died 15th century), which occurs in a manuscript, preserved in Turkey, concerning the shrines of saints in Tabriz.

A  phrase "Buri Buri" which in Persian means Biya Biya or in English: Come! Come! is mentioned by Rumi from the mouth of Shams Tabrizi in this poem:

The word Buri is mentioned by Hussain Tabrizi Karbali with regards to the Shaykh Khwajah Abdur-rahim Azh-Abaadi as to "come".

In the Harzandi dialect of Harzand in Azerbaijan as well as the Karingani dialect of Azerbaijan, both recorded in the 20th century, the two words "Biri" and "Burah" means to "come" and are of the same root.

On the language of Maragheh

Hamdollah Mostowfi of the 13th century mentions the language of Maragheh as "Pahlavi Mughayr" (modified Pahlavi).

The 17th-century Ottoman Turkish traveler Evliya Chelebi who traveled to Safavid Iran also states: "The majority of the women in Maragheh converse in Pahlavi".

According to the Encyclopedia of Islam: "At the present day, the inhabitants speak Adhar Turkish, but in the 14th century they still spoke "arabicized Pahlawi" (Nuzhat al-Qolub: Pahlawi Mu’arrab) which means an Iranian dialect of the north western group."

See also 
Azari or the Ancient Language of Azerbaijan
Languages of Azerbaijan
Languages of Iran
Tati (Iran)
Safina-yi Tabriz
Nozhat al-Majales

References

Sources

External links
 
more references
Azapadegan Research Institute for Iranian cultures and civilization (includes research articles on Adhari)

Northwestern Iranian languages
Extinct languages of Asia
Extinct languages of Europe
Languages attested from the 12th century
Languages extinct in the 2nd millennium
History of Talysh
Caspian languages